Olive Loughnane (born 14 January 1976) is an Irish retired racewalker. A four-times Olympian, she is the 2009 world gold medalist in the 20 km walk.

Early life
Loughane was born in 1976 in County Cork, the eldest of seven children. She moved to Carrabane, County Galway, with her family when she was a child. She is a graduate of University College Galway, having obtained a B.Comm. in 1996.

Sporting career
Loughnane competed at four Olympic Games (2000, 2004, 2008 and 2012) and six consecutive editions of the World Championships in Athletics. She won a gold medal at the 2009 World Championships after the disqualification of the original gold medallist for a drug offence. As of December 2016, Loughnane had not received the prize money.

Loughnane failed to finish the walk at the 2010 European Athletics Championships. She had a win on the 2011 World Race Walking circuit at the Dudinska Patdesiatka in March 2011.

Loughnane announced her retirement in February 2013.

Achievements

Sports administration
Loughnane became a member of the Sport Ireland High Performance Committee after retiring from competitive sport in 2013, and subsequently became of a member of the board of Sport Ireland.

Personal life
Loughnane currently lives in Coachford, Cork with her husband, Martin Corkery, and their three children.  She currently works as a Statistician in the Central Statistics Office (CSO).

References

External links

1976 births
Sportspeople from County Cork
Sportspeople from County Galway
Alumni of the University of Galway
Irish female racewalkers
Irish statisticians
Olympic athletes of Ireland
Athletes (track and field) at the 2000 Summer Olympics
Athletes (track and field) at the 2004 Summer Olympics
Athletes (track and field) at the 2008 Summer Olympics
Athletes (track and field) at the 2012 Summer Olympics
World Athletics Championships medalists
Sport Ireland officials
Living people
World Athletics Championships winners